The Eau Claire Commissioners were a Minnesota–Wisconsin League minor league baseball team that played under that name from 1910 to 1912. The team was based in Eau Claire, Wisconsin. Notably, Major League Baseball Hall of Famer Burleigh Grimes played for the team. Jack Kading played for the club when they were the Puffs.

References

External links
Baseball Referenced

Baseball teams established in 1886
Baseball teams disestablished in 1912
Defunct minor league baseball teams
Wisconsin State League teams
Minnesota-Wisconsin League teams
Northwestern League teams
Sports in Eau Claire, Wisconsin
1886 establishments in Wisconsin
1912 disestablishments in Wisconsin
Defunct baseball teams in Wisconsin
Northern League (1902-71) baseball teams